

Demographics
At the 2001 India census, Kangeyanallur had a population of 12,672. Males constitute 50% of the population and females 50%. Kangeyanallur has an average literacy rate of 79%, higher than the national average of 59.5%: male literacy is 85%, and female literacy is 73%. In Kangeyanallur, 10% of the population is under 6 years of age.

References

Vellore
Neighbourhoods in Vellore
Cities and towns in Vellore district